The 2007 All-Ireland Senior Club Camogie Championship for the leading clubs in the women's team field sport of camogie was won by Cashel (Tip), who defeated Athenry (Gal) in the final, played at Limerick. Clare Grogan  scored 2–5 for Cashel in their semi-final victory over Rossa while teenager Jessica Gill scored 2–6 for Athenry against four-in-a-row seeking Freshford in their semifinal, for whom two late goals by Ann Dalton cut the deficit

Arrangements
The championship was organised on the traditional provincial system used in Gaelic Games since the 1880s, with O’Donovan Rossa and St Lachtain’s, Freshford winning the championships of the other two provinces.

The Final
Philly Fogarty and Jill Horan dominated midfield enabling Cashel to claim the title.

Final stages

References

External links
 Camogie Association

2007 in camogie
2007